Kids is a 1995 American coming-of-age drama film directed by Larry Clark and written by Harmony Korine. It stars Leo Fitzpatrick, Justin Pierce, Chloë Sevigny, and Rosario Dawson, all in their film debuts. Set in 1995, Fitzpatrick, Pierce, Sevigny, Dawson, and other newcomers portray a group of teenagers in New York City. They are characterized as hedonists, who engage in sexual acts and substance abuse, throughout the course of a single day.

Ben Detrick of the New York Times has described the film as "Lord of the Flies with skateboards, nitrous oxide and hip-hop... There is no thunderous moral reckoning, only observational detachment." The film was deemed controversial upon its release in 1995 and caused public debate over its artistic merit. It received an NC-17 rating from the MPAA, but was released without a rating. Critical response was mixed, and the film grossed $20.4 million on a $1.5 million budget.

Plot 
A boy named Telly and a 12-year-old girl are kissing on a bed. With no adults around, Telly, who is 17, persuades the girl, who is a virgin, to have sex with him. Afterwards, he meets with his best friend, Casper, and they discuss his sexual experience. Telly vocalizes his desire to keep having sex with virginal girls. The pair then enters a local store, where Casper shoplifts a 40-oz. bottle of malt liquor as Telly distracts the cashier. Looking for drugs, food, and a place to hang out, they head to their friend Paul's apartment, despite expressing their dislike of him on the way there. Once they arrive at Paul's house, they join the other boys in boasting about their sexual prowess and their nonchalant attitudes to unprotected sex and venereal diseases.

Across the city, a group of girls, among them Ruby and Jennie, are talking about sex. Their attitudes contradict that of the boys on many topics, particularly oral sex and the significance of the individuals to whom they lost their virginity. Ruby and Jennie mention that they were recently tested for STDs at Ruby's request, though Jennie only got tested to keep Ruby company. Ruby's test is negative, though she has had multiple sexual encounters, many of them unprotected intercourse.

Jennie tests positive for HIV. She tells the nurse that she has had sex only once, with Telly. Distraught over her results, Jennie spends the rest of the day trying to find Telly to prevent him from passing the virus on to another girl. Meanwhile, Telly and Casper walk to Telly's house and steal money from Telly's mother, who is preoccupied with taking care of her new baby.

They go to Washington Square Park and purchase a dime bag of marijuana from a Rastafarian. They then talk and smoke with a few friends, one of whom gives a blunt-rolling tutorial. During the hangout, Casper and many others taunt a gay couple passing through the park. On the side, Telly briefly talks to Misha, a girl who strongly dislikes Casper and calls him a jerk.

As Casper rides on a skateboard, he carelessly bumps into a man who angrily threatens and pushes him. The man is struck in the back of the head with a skateboard by Casper's friend Harold, causing him to collapse. Several other skaters join in, beating, stomping, and hitting the man with their skateboards until he is rendered unconscious by a final blow to the head by Casper. Telly then spits on him.

While discussing whether or not they killed the man at the park, Telly and some of the group pick up a 13-year-old girl named Darcy—the virginal younger sister of an acquaintance—with whom Telly wants to have sex. He successfully convinces her to accompany them to a public pool. The other girls engage in kissing and flirtation, but Darcy shows restraint. Afterwards, the group goes to an unsupervised party at the house of another friend named Steven.

Meanwhile, Jennie makes her way to Washington Square Park, where she speaks to Misha, who tells her about Telly's possible whereabouts at "N.A.S.A.". When Jennie arrives at the club, she runs into Fidget, a raver boy, who shoves a pill into her mouth, which he says is supposed to make "Special K look weak". The drug turns out to be a depressant. Once its effects set in, Jennie discovers that Telly is at the party at Steven's house.

Jennie arrives at the party only to learn she is too late, as she discovers Telly having sex with Darcy, thus exposing her to HIV. Emotionally drained and still under the influence, Jennie cries and passes out on a couch among the other sleeping partygoers. A drunk Casper then rapes Jennie unprotected as she sleeps, unwittingly exposing himself to HIV. Another teenager at the party was able to witness the assault. As daylight approaches, a voice-over by Telly explains how sex is the only worthwhile thing in his life. The following day, a naked and confused Casper wakes up and says, "Jesus Christ, what happened?"

Cast 

 Leo Fitzpatrick as Telly
 Justin Pierce as Casper
 Chloë Sevigny as Jennie
 Rosario Dawson as Ruby
 Yakira Peguero as Darcy
 Atabey Rodriguez as Misha
 Jon Abrahams as Steven
 Harold Hunter as Harold
 Sajan Bhagat as Paul
 Hamilton Harris as Hamilton

Additionally, Sarah Henderson portrays the first girl Telly is seen having sex with and Tony Morales and Walter Youngblood portray the gay couple. Julie Stebe-Glorius and Christina Stebe-Glorious appear as Telly's mother and younger brother, respectively. The Rastafari is played by an actor credited as "Dr. Henry". Screenwriter Harmony Korine has an uncredited appearance as Fidget.

Production 

Larry Clark said that he wanted to "make the Great American Teenage Movie, like the Great American Novel." The film is shot in a quasi-documentary style, although all of its scenes are scripted.

In Kids, Clark cast New York City "street" kids with no previous acting experience, notably Leo Fitzpatrick (Telly) and Justin Pierce (Casper). Clark originally decided he wanted to cast Fitzpatrick in a film after watching him skateboard in New York, and cursing when he could not land certain tricks. Korine had met Chloë Sevigny in New York before production began on Kids, and initially cast her in a small role as one of the girls in the swimming pool. She then was given the leading role of Jennie when the actress hired to play Jennie, Mia Kirshner, was fired. Sevigny and Korine went on to make  Gummo (1997) and Julien Donkey-Boy (1999) together. Korine makes a cameo in the club scene with Jennie, as the kid wearing Coke-bottle glasses and a Nuclear Assault shirt who gives her drugs, though the part is credited to his brother Avi.

Korine reportedly wrote the film's screenplay in 1993, at the age of 18, and principal photography took place during the summer of 1994. Contrary to the perception of many viewers, the film, according to Korine, was almost entirely scripted, with the only exception being the scene with Casper on the couch at the end, which was improvised. Gus Van Sant had been attached to the film as a producer. After insufficient interest had been generated in the film, he left the project. Under incoming producer Cary Woods, the project found sufficient independent funding for the film. Harvey Weinstein of Miramax, wary of parent The Walt Disney Company's opinion of the risky screenplay, declined to involve Disney in funding the production of the film. After Woods showed him the final cut, Miramax paid $3.5 million to buy the worldwide distribution rights of this film.

Release
Miramax, which was owned by The Walt Disney Company, paid $3.5 million to buy the worldwide distribution rights. Later, Harvey and Bob Weinstein (the co-chairmen of Miramax) were forced to buy back the film from Disney and created Shining Excalibur Films (a one-off company) to release the film, due to Disney's policy, that at the time, forbid the release of NC-17 rated films (and the fact their appeal to the MPAA to lower it to R was denied). Eamonn Bowles was hired to be the chief operating officer of Shining Excalibur Films.

The film, which cost $1.5 million to produce, grossed $7.4 million in the North American box office and $20 million worldwide. According to Peter Biskind's book Down and Dirty Pictures, Eamonn Bowles had stated that Harvey and Bob Weinstein might have personally profited up to $2 million each.

Reception
The film received mixed reviews. On Rotten Tomatoes, the film has a "rotten" score of 47% based on 58 reviews, with an average rating of 5.70/10. The site's consensus reads, "Kids isn't afraid to test viewers' limits, but the point of its nearly non-stop provocation is likely to be lost in all the repellent characters and unpleasant imagery". On Metacritic, the film has a score of 63/100 based on reviews from 18 critics, indicating "generally favorable reviews".

The film was championed by some prominent critics, including Roger Ebert of The Chicago Sun Times, who gave the film three and a half out of four stars. "Kids is the kind of movie that needs to be talked about afterward. It doesn't tell us what it means. Sure, it has a 'message', involving safe sex. But safe sex is not going to civilize these kids, make them into curious, capable citizens. What you realize, thinking about Telly, is that life has given him nothing that interests him, except for sex, drugs and skateboards. His life is a kind of hell, briefly interrupted by orgasms."

Janet Maslin of The New York Times called the film a "wake-up call to the modern world" about the nature of present-day youth in urban life. Other critics have labeled it exploitative (in the lascivious sense) as borderline "child pornography". Other critics derided the film, with the most common criticism relating to the perceived lack of artistic merit.

Feminist scholar Bell Hooks spoke extensively about the film in Cultural Criticism and Transformation: "Kids fascinated me as a film precisely because when you heard about it, it seemed like the perfect embodiment of the kind of postmodern, notions of journeying and dislocation and fragmentation and yet when you go to see it, it has simply such a conservative take on gender, on race, on the politics of HIV."

Accolades

AFI's 100 Years...100 Heroes and Villains   
Telly - Nominated Villain

In popular culture 
 American rapper Wale references Kids in his song titled "Legendary" from his album Ambition.
 In August 2010, American rapper Mac Miller released the mixtape K.I.D.S., and its cover art, title, and some musical themes pay homage to the film. Some audio clips from the film are also part of the mixtape in between songs.
 American rapper and record producer Dr. Dre references the film by name in "Guilty Conscience". In the second verse, he voices against the "guilty conscience" of a fictional character within the song who is about to commit statutory rape, a main theme in the movie. 
 Canadian R&B singer The Weeknd described his childhood as "Kids without the AIDS."
 Metal band Emmure released a song on their album Felony called "I Thought You Met Telly and Turned Me Into Casper".
 French rapper OrelSan has a line about the movie in the song "La Quête" where he says "J'ai 15 ans, je regarde Kids en boucle, je traîne avec des gars comme Casper", which can be translated to "I'm 15 years old, I watch Kids on loop. I hang out with guys like Casper"

Soundtrack 

Creation of the film's soundtrack was overseen by Lou Barlow.
 Daniel Johnston – "Casper"
 Deluxx Folk Implosion – "Daddy Never Understood"
 Folk Implosion – "Nothing Gonna Stop"
 Folk Implosion – "Jenny's Theme"
 Folk Implosion – "Simean Groove"
 Daniel Johnston – "Casper the Friendly Ghost"
 Folk Implosion – "Natural One"
 Sebadoh – "Spoiled"
 Folk Implosion – "Crash"
 Folk Implosion – "Wet Stuff"
 Lo-Down – "Mad Fright Night"
 Folk Implosion – "Raise the Bells"
 Slint – "Good Morning, Captain"

References

External links 

 
 
 

1995 films
1995 directorial debut films
1995 drama films
1995 independent films
1990s American films
1990s coming-of-age drama films
1990s English-language films
1990s teen drama films
American coming-of-age drama films
American independent films
American teen drama films
Film controversies in the United States
Films about drugs
Films about rape in the United States
Films about virginity
Films directed by Larry Clark
Films set in New York City
Films shot in New York City
HIV/AIDS in American films
Killer Films films
Obscenity controversies in film
Rating controversies in film
Teensploitation